Xiphophyllum is a genus of bush crickets in the tribe Platyphyllini.

The species of this genus are found in Southern America.

Species
 Xiphophyllum abbreviatum (Brunner von Wattenwyl, 1895) 
 Xiphophyllum acuminatum (Brunner von Wattenwyl, 1895)
 Xiphophyllum angustelaminatum Beier, 1960
 Xiphophyllum atricauda (Caudell, 1918)
 Xiphophyllum atrosignatum (Brunner von Wattenwyl, 1895)
 Xiphophyllum brunneum Beier, 1960
 Xiphophyllum connexum (Brunner von Wattenwyl, 1895)
 Xiphophyllum granosum (Brunner von Wattenwyl, 1895)
 Xiphophyllum latipenne Beier, 1960
 Xiphophyllum limbatum Beier, 1960
 Xiphophyllum pallidenotatum (Brunner von Wattenwyl, 1895)
 Xiphophyllum unicolor Beier, 1960
 Xiphophyllum verrucosum (Brunner von Wattenwyl, 1895)

References

Pseudophyllinae
Tettigoniidae genera